The 1977 Monterrey WCT was a men's tennis tournament played on indoor carpet courts in Monterrey, Mexico. The event was part of the 1977 World Championship Tennis circuit. The tournament was held from February 26 to March 6, 1977. Unseeded Wojciech Fibak won the singles title.

Finals

Singles
 Wojciech Fibak defeated  Vitas Gerulaitis 6–4, 6–3
 It was Fibak's 1st singles title of the year and the 4th of his career.

Doubles
 Wojciech Fibak /  Ross Case defeated  Billy Martin /  Bill Scanlon 3–6, 6–3, 6–4

References

Monterrey
1977 in Mexican tennis
Monterrey WCT